Francisca Cualladó Baixauli (December 3, 1890 - September 19, 1936) was a Spanish Catholic seamstress born in Molino de San Isidro, ward of Ruzafa, Valencia, who was executed by firing squad at the Torre Espioca of Benifaió in 1936, during the Spanish Civil War. She was considered a martyr by the Catholic Church, and beatified by Pope John Paul II on 11 March 2001.  Her feast day is celebrated on September 19.

References 

 Cebellán, Vicent Gabarda (1996). La represión en la retaguardia republicana: País Valenciano, 1936-1939. Vol. 18 de Arxius i documents. Edicions Alfons el Magnànim, Institució Valenciana d'Estudis i Investigació, p. 374. 

1890 births
1936 deaths
People from Valencia
Martyrs of the Spanish Civil War
People executed by Spain by firing squad
Spanish beatified people